The World Sauna Championships were an annual endurance contest held in Heinola, Finland, from 1999 to 2010. They originated from unofficial sauna-sitting competitions that resulted in a ban from a swimming hall in Heinola. The Championships were first held in 1999 and grew to feature contestants from over 20 countries. Sauna bathing at extreme conditions is a severe health risk: all competitors competed at their own risk, and had to sign a form agreeing not to take legal action against the organizers. Notably, the Finnish Sauna Society strongly opposed the event. 

After the death of one finalist and near-death of another during the 2010 championship, the organizers announced that they would not hold another event. This followed an announcement by prosecutors in March that the organizing committee would not be charged for negligence, as their investigation revealed that the contestant who died may have used painkillers and ointments that were forbidden by the organizers.

Format 

The championships began with preliminary rounds and ended in the finals, where the best six men and women would see who could sit in the sauna the longest. The starting temperature in the men's competition was 110 °C (230 °F). Half a litre of water was poured on the stove every 30 seconds. The winner was the last person to stay in the sauna and walk out without outside help. The host country usually dominated the event, as only one foreign competitor ever made it into the finals in the men's competition. The first non-Finnish winner in the women's competition was Natallia Tryfanava from Belarus in 2003.

Rules 
 The starting temperature is 110 degrees Celsius. Half a litre of water will be poured on the stove every 30 seconds.
 Use of alcohol is prohibited prior to and during the competition.
 Competitors must wash themselves beforehand, and remove any creams and lotions.
 Competitor must sit erect, their buttocks and thighs on the bench.
 Ordinary swimsuits must be used. Pant legs in men's swimsuits may be up to 20 centimetres long, and women's shoulder straps may be up to 5 centimetres wide.
 Hair that reaches the shoulders must be tied into a ponytail.
 Touching the skin and brushing is prohibited.
 Competitors must not disturb each other.
 At the request of the judges, competitors must show that they are in their senses with a thumbs up.
 Competitors must be able to leave the sauna unaided to qualify.
 A breach of the rules results in a warning. Another one results in disqualification.
 The last person leaving the sauna unaided is the winner.

TV broadcasting and other media
In 2004, Nippon Television filmed a documentary about the World Sauna Championships. The program had an audience of about 40 million in Japan. The network did a similar documentary again in 2007, when they filmed a whole week in Heinola and in Lahti. This time Kazumi Morohoshi (former singer in a popular boy band Hikaru Genji) was with them and also took part in the competition. He ended in the first round, with a time 5:41. Also in 2007, American sportswriter Rick Reilly (who described it as "quite possibly the world's dumbest sport") was also in Heinola. His time in the first round was 3:10 and was eliminated from the second round.

2010 incident 
On 7 August 2010, Russian finalist and former third-place finisher Vladimir Ladyzhensky and Finnish five-time champion Timo Kaukonen passed out after six minutes of  heat, both suffering from serious burns and trauma. According to a spectator, Kaukonen was able to leave the sauna with assistance, but Ladyzhensky had to be dragged out, suffering from convulsions, burns, and blisters. Ladyzhensky died despite resuscitation and Kaukonen was rushed to the hospital. He was reported to suffer from extreme burn injuries, and his condition was described as critical, but stable. Just a few minutes before the finals, Kaukonen told the Norwegian newspaper Verdens Gang that the saunas used for the 2010 championship were a lot more extreme than the saunas used for previous competitions. As Kaukonen and Ladyzhensky were disqualified for not leaving the sauna unaided, Ilkka Pöyhiä became the winner.

The organizer, Ossi Arvela, said that there will probably never be another sauna competition. Two days later the City of Heinola noted that there are no official decisions about the future of the event, and the decisions would be made after the incident has been examined. Arvela later reported that Finnish police had decided not to file charges in connection with the tragedy, but were continuing to investigate. Kaukonen woke up from a medically induced coma six weeks after the event. His respiratory system was scorched, 70% of his skin was burnt and eventually his kidneys failed as well. In late October, Kaukonen was reported to be recovering quickly. He did not blame the organizers for his injuries.

Ladyzhensky's autopsy concluded that he had died of third-degree burns. His death was aided by his use of strong painkillers and local anesthetic grease on his skin. Kaukonen was competing according to the rules.

On April 20, 2011, the City of Heinola announced that they would no longer organize the event, noting that "If the city was to organize the World Sauna Championships in the future, the original playful and joyous characteristics of the event should be reintroduced. No ways to achieve this have been found."

Champions

See also 
 Finnish sauna
 List of unusual deaths

References

External links
BBC: Finland's hot competition
BBC: Sauna rivals feel the heat
Outside: Hotties

Finnish culture
Sport in Heinola
Recurring sporting events established in 1999
Recurring sporting events disestablished in 2010
Sauna
Sauna